The British Arctic Air Route Expedition (BAARE) was a privately funded expedition to the east coast and interior of the island of Greenland from 1930 to 1931. Led by Gino Watkins, it aimed to improve maps and charts of poorly surveyed sections of Greenland's coastline, and to gather climate data from the coast and interior during the north polar winter. This venture was followed by the smaller 1932–1933 East Greenland expedition, led by Watkins until his death.

Expedition
The expedition travelled to Greenland aboard the Quest, a historic sealing vessel previously used by Ernest Shackleton in 1921–1922.  
Expedition members included  Frederick Chapman, John Rymill, Quintin Riley (meteorologist), Augustine Courtauld, J. M. Scott, Captain Percy Lemon (wireless operator and signal officer), L. R. Wager (geologist), Alfred Stephenson (chief surveyor), Lt. Martin Lindsay, Flight Lt. N. H. D'Aeth (pilot), W. E. Hampton (second pilot & aircraft engineer), Surg. Lt. E. W. Bingham (doctor) and H. I. Cozens (photographer and assistant pilot).

Base hut
Here most of the members of the expedition's shore party overwintered, made contact with local Inuit, and sent out light expeditions to chart and survey adjoining areas of coastline.

Icecap Station
An expedition member, Augustine Courtauld, volunteered to serve as a solo observer for a five-month tour of duty here during the height of the 1930–1931 winter. Watkins and other expedition members relieved him on 5 May 1931, just as Courtauld's food and fuel were running out. Courtauld's observations included some of the first extended data sets ever gathered from the Greenland icecap interior during a polar winter.

Conclusion and honours
The members of the expedition, including Watkins and Courtauld, returned to Denmark and then to England, receiving significant acclaim in both nations.  Key members of the expedition were awarded the Polar Medal by King George V, the first given for Arctic service in 60 years.

Literature 
 Lindsay, Martin: Snowed in with Greenland Eskimos, in: China Journal, Vol. 16 (1932), p.p. 19–24.
 Roberts, David: Into the Great Emptiness, Norton, 368 pages (2022)

See also
Cartographic expeditions to Greenland
Schweizerland
Watkins Range

References

External links
Annals of an Arctic Air-Route
Arctic expeditions
1930s in Greenland
Expeditions from the United Kingdom
20th century in the Arctic